The TG4 Lifetime Achievement Award is given annually as part of Gradam Ceoil TG4. The award is to recognise people  or organisations who have worked to ensure the preservation and development of traditional Irish music .

The following is a list of the recipients of the award.

 2006 – Proinsias Ó Conluain, Co. Tyrone
 2007 – Ciarán Mac Mathúna, Limerick
 2008 – Harry Bradshaw, Co. Wicklow
 2009 – Reg Hall, Kent, England
 2010 – Muiris Ó Rócháin, Co. Kerry
 2011 – Micheál Ó Súilleabháin, Co. Tipperary
 2012 – Eithne agus Brian Vallely, Co. Armagh
 2013 – Na Píobairí Uilleann
 2014 – Mick Moloney, Co. Limerick
 2015 – Taisce Cheol Dúchais Éireann
 2016 – Cairde na Cruite
 2017 – Mick O'Connor, Co. Dublin
 2018 – Pádraigín Ní Uallacháin, Co. Armagh
 2019 – Brendan Mulkere, Co. Clare

References

Traditional music
Irish music awards